Deadly Happy is the third studio album by Andreas Johnson. It was released on 11 February 2002.

Track listing
 "Shine" - 3.42
 "End of the World" - 4.15
 "Waterfall" - 4.19
 "The Greatest Day" - 3.56
 "Brand New Thing" - 2.50
 "Spirit of You" - 3.46
 "Great Undying Love" - 4.37
 "Deadly Happy" - 2.57
 "The Pretty Ones" - 3.13
 "This Time" - 3.13
 "Make Me Beautiful" - 3.53
 "My Love (Song for a Butterfly)" - 3.35
 "Starcrossed" - 3.46

Charts

References

External links

2002 albums
Andreas Johnson albums